Muito Show (Literally english: Much Show) is a Brazilian comedy talk show and entertainment program that has aired on RedeTV! since May 27, 2013 and ended on May 22, 2015.

The show is broadcast live weeknights at 6:30 pm (BRT/AMT tape-delayed).

Co-hosts

Timeline

See also
 List of programs broadcast by RedeTV!

References

External links
 Official website

2013 Brazilian television series debuts
Brazilian television news shows
RedeTV! original programming